Confederation Life Insurance Company, also known as Confederation Life, was a major Canadian insurance company and financial services provider.  Its global head office was located in Toronto in what is now the Rogers Building. The company had operations in Canada, the United States, the United Kingdom, and Bermuda, and an inactive office in Cuba.

History
The company was founded in 1871 by John Kay Macdonald (1837–1928) in Toronto, then established operations in the UK in 1906 (with a head office at Stevenage, Hertfordshire) and later into the United States with offices in Atlanta.

Macdonald retired in 1920 and was succeeded by Charles Strange Macdonald from 1921 to 1946 and then John Kenneth Macdonald from 1946 to 1969. John Kenneth MacDonald's daughters, Peggy Latimer and Ann Macintosh, never were operationally involved in the firm, but they did inherit ownership from their father.

In 1969, J. Craig Davidson became president and for the first time, the firm was no longer led by a member of the Macdonald family.

Demise
Confederation Life was forced into liquidation in 1994. The process began on August 11 of that year. The international operations of the company made the liquidation process somewhat complex.

The company had financial obligations to 260,000 individual policyholders in Canada and another 1.5 million people were members of a group insurance plan through the company.

During the liquidation process, CompCorp, by then called Assuris, was able to guarantee the assets of all policyholders, and the process cost the compensation fund only CA$5 million.

The various blocks of business held by the company were taken over by several different Canadian and American insurance companies. The liquidator was KPMG. As of 2010, the process was still ongoing.

It was the third liquidation of an insurance company in Canada in consecutive years, Les Coopérants (1992) and Sovereign Life (1993) and was followed in 2012 by Union of Canada Life.

See also 
 Confederation Life Building

References

External links
 Confederation Life Insurance Company, In Liquidation

Defunct financial services companies of Canada